ATS-4 (Applications Technology Satellite) also known as ATS-D was a communications satellite launched by NASA on August 10, 1968 from Cape Canaveral through an Atlas-Centaur rocket.

Objectives
The objective of ATS-4 was to investigate the possibilities of a gravity gradient stabilization system (the method of stabilizing artificial satellites).

Features
The satellite has a cylindrical shape with a  diameter and  height (about  considering the motor cover) with the surface covered by solar panels, and stabilized by gravity gradient.

Instruments
A total of four experiments were conducted during the mission:

 Microwave Transponder
 Gravity Gradient Stabilization
 Image Orthicon (Day/Night) Camera
 Ion Thruster

Mission
The Atlas and Centaur stages performed satisfactorily and placed the Centaur/ATS-4 in an elliptical parking orbit, the Centaur stage, however, failed to re-ignite after a 61-minute coast. The failure was determined to be caused freezing of the hydrogen peroxide supply lines to the Centaur engines. High atmospheric drag due to the low altitude of the achieved orbit precipitated the orbital decay of the spacecraft, yet, still achieved good results in some of the experiments. The primary objective to put a spacecraft stabilized by gravity gradient in orbit was not reached. The satellite reentered the atmosphere on 17 October 1968.

References

External links
 ATS, Past NASA Missions
 ATS, NASA Science Missions

1968 in spaceflight
Applications Technology Satellites